Lannion Football Club (commonly referred to as simply Lannion) is a French football club based in Lannion in the Brittany region. The club was founded in 2000 and currently plays in the Championnat National 3, the fifth division of French football, after achieving their most recent promotion from the Division d'Honneur in the 2011–12 season.

Current squad

References

External links
 Official site

Association football clubs established in 2000
2000 establishments in France
Football clubs in Brittany
Sport in Côtes-d'Armor